Helicina is a genus of tropical and subtropical land snails with an operculum, terrestrial gastropod mollusks.

This is the type genus of its family (Helicinidae) and subfamily (Helicinae), as well as the superfamily Helicinoidea. This radiation is considered a fairly close relative e.g. of the water-living nerites (Neritidae), among the rather primitive snail clade Neritimorpha to which these all belong.

Selected species
Species within the genus Helicina include:

From Central America:
 Helicina amoena L. Pfeiffer, 1849
 Helicina rostrata Morelet, 1849
 Helicina trossula Morelet, 1849

From Costa Rica:

 Helicina boeckeleri Richling, 2001
 Helicina deppeana parvidens Pilsbry, 1920
 Helicina funcki funcki Pfr, 1848
 Helicina funcki costaricensis Wagner, 1905
 Helicina hojarasca Richling, 2001
 Helicna oweniana coccinostoma Morelet, 1849
 Helicina oweniana anozona Martens, 1875 
 Helicina pitalensis Wagner, 1911 
 Helicina tenuis L.Pfeiffer, 1849
 Helicina tenuis tenuis Pfr., 1848 
 Helicina tenuis pittieri Wagner, 1911

From Brazil:

 Helicina angulata Sowerby, 1842
 Helicina angulifera Wagner, 1910
 Helicina besckei Pfeiffer, 1848
 Helicina bicincta Gloyne, 1872
 Helicina brasiliensis Gray, 1824
 Helicina caracolla (Moricand, 1836)
 Helicina carinata d’Orbigny, 1835
 Helicina concentrica Pfeiffer, 1848
 Helicina densestriata Wagner, 1910
 Helicina fulva d’Orbigny, 1835
 Helicina guajarana Baker, 1914
 Helicina haematostoma (Moricand, 1839)
 Helicina iguapensis Pilsbry, 1900
 Helicina inaequistriata Pilsbry, 1900
 Helicina juruana Ihering, 1904
 Helicina laterculus Baker, 1914
 Helicina leopoldinae Wagner, 1906
 Helicina leptrotopis Wagner, 1910
 Helicina leucozonalis Ancey, 1892
 Helicina lirifera Ancey, 1892
 Helicina lundi Beck, 1858
 Helicina menkeana Philippi, 1847
 Helicina moreletiana Pfeiffer, 1851
 Helicina oxytropis Gray, 1839
Helicina pandiensis Wagner, 1905
 Helicina schereri Baker, 1914
 Helicina siolii Haas, 1949
 Helicina sordida King & Broderip, 1832
 Helicina tilei Pfeiffer, 1847
 Helicina variabilis Wagner, 1827
 Helicina wettsteini Wagner, 1906

From the Lesser Antilles:
 Helicina dysoni (L. Pfeiffer, 1849)
 Helicina fasciata
 Helicina guppyi
 Helicina nemoralis Guppy, 1866
 Helicina platychila
 Helicina rhodostoma (endemic to Dominica)

From the USA:
 Helicina orbiculata

From Cuba:
 Helicina aspersa
 Helicina declivis Gundlach in Pfeiffer, 1860
 Helicina globulosa d’Orbigny, 1842
 Helicina holguinensis Clench & Aguayo, 1953
 Helicina lembeyana Poey, 1854
 Helicina monteiberia Sarasúa, 1976
 Helicina poeyi Pfeiffer, 1859
 Helicina reeveana Pfeiffer, 1848
 Helicina subdepressa Poey, 1854
 Helicina subglobulosa Poey, 1852

From other locations
 Helicina flammea Quoy & Gaimard, 1832 - Tonga.
 Helicina vitiensis Mousson, 1865 (Fiji Islands)

References

External links
 Lamarck, J.B.M. (1799). Prodrome d'une nouvelle classification des coquilles, comprenant une rédaction appropriée des caractères géneriques, et l'établissement d'un grand nombre de genres nouveaux. Mémoires de la Société d'Histoire Naturelle de Paris. 1: 63-91
 Montfort P. [Denys de. (1808-1810). Conchyliologie systématique et classification méthodique des coquilles. Paris: Schoell. Vol. 1: pp. lxxxvii + 409 [1808]. Vol. 2: pp. 676 + 16 [1810 ]
 Say T. (1818). Account of two new genera, and several new species, of fresh water and land snails. Journal of the Academy of Natural Sciences of Philadelphia. 1: 276-284
 Fischer P. & Crosse H. (1870-1902). Études sur les mollusques terrestres et fluviatiles du Mexique et du Guatemala. Mission scientifique au Mexique et dans l'Amerique Centrale. Recherches zoologiques, Partie 7
 Swainson, W. (1840). A treatise on malacology or shells and shell-fish. London, Longman. viii + 419 pp

 

 
Helicinidae
Taxonomy articles created by Polbot